Královice may refer to places in the Czech Republic:

Královice (Kladno District), a municipality and village in the Central Bohemian Region
Královice (Prague), a municipal part of Prague

See also
Kralovice (disambiguation)